Emerson Park is a London Overground station in the Emerson Park neighbourhood of Hornchurch in the London Borough of Havering, east London. The station entrance is on Butts Green Road, with minimal station buildings other than a canopy over the single platform. Emerson Park is one of the least used stations in London and the least used London Overground station.

History

Steam era
The Romford to Upminster line was constructed in 1893 as a branch of the London, Tilbury and Southend Railway (LTSR). The branch connected at Upminster with the main line from London Fenchurch Street to Shoeburyness and the branch line to Grays that had opened in 1892. The new line passed mostly through fields and skirted the northern limits of the town of Hornchurch, which was already served by an LTSR station a similar distance to the south of the town. The LTSR was prompted to open a station at Emerson Park because of property development in the immediate area and in 1908 the Great Eastern Railway (GER) proposed a new railway station at Gidea Park, approximately 1 mile to the northwest on the line from Liverpool Street. The LTSR station opened on 1 October 1909 as Emerson Park Halt and the rival station at Gidea Park in 1910. A run-round loop was constructed 500 yards to the west to enable extra trains to run between Emerson Park and Upminster.

In the April 1920 timetable there are 27 down (towards Tilbury) and 22 up (towards Romford) trains a day. Destinations varied with most services running between Romford and Upminster. There were six through trains to Grays, four to Tilbury and five short runs between Emerson Park and Upminster, with a similar number of return trains. On Sundays there were nine trains in each direction. By 1939 this had increased to 35 down trains and 27 up services on weekdays, still with nine in each direction on Sundays and a similar service pattern. Originally named Emerson Park Halt, and shown in some timetables and on some signage throughout its history as Emerson Park & Great Nelmes, the station name was later simplified to 'Emerson Park', but the date of this change is not recorded. The London, Tilbury and Southend Railway was purchased by the Midland Railway in 1912 and was amalgamated into the London, Midland and Scottish Railway on 1 January 1923. The station and line became part of British Railways on 1 January 1948, initially as part of the London Midland Region and then the Eastern Region from 20 February 1949. The short workings between Emerson Park and Upminster were eliminated with all services at Emerson Park calling at both Romford and Upminster from the 1949 timetable.

Diesel era
Diesel multiple unit operation began on 15 September 1956 and the current service pattern was established when through service beyond Upminster ceased. The September 1957 timetable shows a regular half hourly service at the station with services to Romford and Upminster from 06:00 to 21:30 and no service on Sundays.  The station became part of the London & South Eastern sector in 1982 that became Network SouthEast in 1986. The last day of diesel multiple unit operation was on Saturday 10 May 1986.

Electric era
Electric train service began operating on Monday 12 May 1986. Following the privatisation of British Rail the station and train services were operated by First Great Eastern from 1997 to 2004, National Express East Anglia from 2004 to 2012 and Greater Anglia from 2012 to 2015. Oyster pay as you go has been available at the station since 2010. The station was taken over by London Overground, a subsidiary of Transport for London, on 31 May 2015 and a Sunday service was restored from 13 December 2015.

Design

The station consists of a side platform located to the north of the single track. Access to the street is provided by a ramp. The station is of basic design and has no buildings other than a canopy covering part of the platform. The Havering Council local register of historic interest describes the building as "Canopy over single platform. Simple iron ‘H’ posts holding up a steel frame, with corrugated sheeting forming a curved roof. Timber valances edging roofline." There are Oyster card validators and a ticket vending machine. Digital display boards and voice announcements provide departure information.

Location
The station is named after the Emerson Park housing estate, located to the northeast. Hornchurch is additionally served by Hornchurch and Upminster Bridge stations, both on the London Underground's District line. London Buses routes 165, 256 and 370 serve the station.

Services

The station is in London fare zone 6. Service from the station is two trains per hour to Upminster and two per hour to Romford. The timetabled journey time to Upminster is five minutes and to Romford is four minutes. Services run Monday to Saturday between approximately 06:15 and 22:00, and on Sundays from approximately 08:45 to 20:00. Emerson Park is one of the least used stations in London and the least used London Overground station. The numbers of passenger entries and exits at the station have been recorded as follows:

Note: due to a change in methodology of counting entries/exits, the change from 2014–15 to 2015–16 may be overstated.

Notes

References

External links

Railway stations in the London Borough of Havering
DfT Category F2 stations
Former London, Tilbury and Southend Railway stations
Railway stations in Great Britain opened in 1909
Railway stations served by London Overground